Andrea Zaccagno (born 27 May 1997) is an Italian professional footballer who plays as a goalkeeper for  club Rimini.

Club career
Born in Padua, he began his career with Padova. In 2014, he was signed by Torino, with whom he won the Campionato Primavera and Supercoppa Primavera in 2015.

Zaccagno made his professional debut in the Serie B for Pro Vercelli on 11 February 2017 in a game against Spezia when he had to come on as a substitute in the 56th minute after Ivan Provedel was sent off.

On 31 January 2019, he joined Vibonese on loan.

On 24 January 2020, he joined Serie B club Virtus Entella on loan.

On 25 September 2020, he signed with Cremonese on a permanent basis.

On 17 February 2022, Zaccagno joined Perugia in Serie B until the end of the season.

On 12 July 2022, Zaccagno signed with Rimini.

International career
With the Italy U-19 he took part as second keeper at the 2016 UEFA European Under-19 Championship, where Italy reached the final and finished as runners-up.

With the Italy U-20 he took part at the 2017 FIFA U-20 World Cup, helping the team to a third-place finish, their best ever result in the competition.

Career statistics

Club

Honours

Club
Torino
Campionato Primavera: 2014–15
Supercoppa Primavera: 2015

References

External links
 

1997 births
Living people
Sportspeople from Padua
Footballers from Veneto
Italian footballers
Association football goalkeepers
Italy youth international footballers
Serie B players
Serie C players
Torino F.C. players
F.C. Pro Vercelli 1892 players
U.S. Pistoiese 1921 players
A.S. Pro Piacenza 1919 players
U.S. Vibonese Calcio players
Virtus Entella players
U.S. Cremonese players
A.C. Perugia Calcio players
Rimini F.C. 1912 players